Rubus probabilis is an uncommon North American species of brambles in the rose family. It grows in the southeastern United States from Maryland to Mississippi.

The genetics of Rubus is extremely complex, so that it is difficult to decide on which groups should be recognized as species. There are many rare species with limited ranges such as this. Further study is suggested to clarify the taxonomy.

References

probabilis
Plants described in 1923
Flora of the Southeastern United States
Flora without expected TNC conservation status